Severed Ties is the debut studio album by Australian metalcore band the Amity Affliction. It was released on 4 October 2008 through Boomtown Records, which debuted at No. 26 on the ARIA Albums Chart, and No. 6 on the related Australian Artists Albums Chart.

The album was the last release to feature guitarist Chris Burt and the first to feature drummer Ryan Burt.

Background 

"Poison Pen Letters" was re-recorded for Severed Ties, it originally appeared on the demo compilation, State of Affairs – a collection of tracks by hardcore bands from the five mainland states of Australia. "Love Is a Battlefield" is a cover of a track by Pat Benatar. Three tracks contained samples from feature films, however due to copyright restrictions the label was forced to remove them. The first few thousand copies printed of the album retained the samples: "I Heart Roberts'" contains one from the film, Hot Rod, "The Blair Snitch Project" had a sample from True Romance in its intro, and "Stairway to Hell" contains sound samples from Hot Rod and Happy Gilmore. The group's insider joke is in the initialism, "B.D.K.I.A.F.", which stands for "Big Dick Know It All Fuck"; while "Do You Party?" is a reference to a joke in Hot Rod.

Track listing

Personnel

The Amity Affliction
Joel Birch – unclean vocals
Ahren Stringer – bass, clean vocals
Troy Brady – lead guitar
Chris Burt – rhythm guitar
Trad Nathan – keyboards, synths, programming, samples
Ryan Burt – drums

Additional musicians
Helmet Roberts (The Daylight Curse) – guest vocals on "I Heart Roberts'"
Lochlan Watt (Ironhide) – guest vocals on "Snitches Get Stitches"
Matthew Wright (The Getaway Plan) – guest vocals on "So You Melted..." and "Jesse Intense"
Michael Crafter (Confession) – guest vocals on "Jesse Intense"
JJ Peters (Deez Nuts) – guest vocals on "Stairway to Hell"

Production
Darren Thompson – Producer

References 

2008 debut albums
The Amity Affliction albums